The scale insect genus Margarodes is a group in the family Margarodidae. The type species is Margarodes formicarum. The genus was erected in 1828 by Lansdown Guilding who found these waxy "pearls" in the soil on the island of Bahama, associated with ants, and named a species Margarodes formicarum.

Species
 Margarodes aurelianus Hall, 1945
 Margarodes australis Jakubski, 1965
 Margarodes basrahensis Jakubski, 1965
 Margarodes capensis Giard, 1897
 Margarodes carvalhoi Costa, 1950
 Margarodes chukar La, 1967
 Margarodes congolensis Jakubski, 1965
 Margarodes dactyloides McDaniel, 1966
 Margarodes floridanus Jakubski, 1965
 Margarodes formicarum Guilding, 1829
 Margarodes gallicus Signoret, 1876
 Margarodes gimenezi Podtiaguin, 1941
 Margarodes greeni Brain, 1915
 Margarodes morrisoni McDaniel, 1965
 Margarodes newsteadi Brain, 1915
 Margarodes papillosus Green, 1912
 Margarodes paulistus Silvestri, 1939
 Margarodes peringueyi Brain, 1915
 Margarodes perrisii Signoret, 1876
 Margarodes prieskaensis Jakubski, 1965
 Margarodes rileyi Giard, 1897
 Margarodes ruber Brain, 1915
 Margarodes salisburiensis Hall, 1940
 Margarodes similis Morrison, 1924
 Margarodes sinensis Silvestri, 1938
 Margarodes trimeni Giard, 1897
 Margarodes upingtonensis De, 1983
 Margarodes vitis Philippi, 1884
 Margarodes vredendalensis De, 1983
 Margarodes williamsi Jakubski, 1965

Former species

Scale
 Margarodes hameli Cockerell, 1902 now Porphyrophora hamelii
 Margarodes meridionalis Morrison, 1927 now Dimargarodes meridionalis
 Margarodes polonicus Cockerell, 1902 now Porphyrophora polonica

Moths
 Margarodes beryllalis (Margarodes beryttalis) Guenée, 1854 now Stemorrhages sericea
 Margarodes exaula Meyrick, 1888 now Stemorrhages exaula
 Margarodes indica now Diaphania indica
 Margarodes nigropunctalis Bremer, 1864 now Palpita nigropunctalis
 Margarodes sericeolalis Guenée, 1862 now Stemorrhages sericea

References

Endemic fauna of the Bahamas
Margarodidae
Sternorrhyncha genera